Steve Swales (born 26 December 1973) is an English footballer who played in The Football League for Scarborough, Reading, Hull City and Halifax Town, before dropping into non-League football.

References

External links

English footballers
Bridlington Town A.F.C. players
Pickering Town F.C. players
Whitby Town F.C. players
Halifax Town A.F.C. players
Hull City A.F.C. players
Reading F.C. players
Scarborough F.C. players
English Football League players
1973 births
Living people
Association football defenders